Vikram is an Indian actor, producer, playback singer and former dubbing artiste known for his work in Tamil cinema. Besides Tamil, he has also worked in Hindi, Malayalam and Telugu language films. He has featured in over 55 motion pictures, three television programs, and several music videos and commercials. 

An aspiring actor since childhood, Vikram modelled for television commercials and appeared in a short film, hoping to get noticed by casting directors. He made his television debut with the Doordarshan series Galatta Kudumbam (1988), following which his first feature film role came with the experimental film En Kadhal Kanmani (1990). His early career in Tamil cinema saw consecutive box-office failures, after which he attempted a transition to Telugu and Malayalam cinema. Vikram mostly played the lead roles in Telugu films, many of which were financial failures. In Malayalam films, he usually appeared in ensemble films, playing "second fiddle" to established actors like Mammootty and Suresh Gopi, which failed to help his career. Meanwhile, the few sporadic appearances he made in Tamil cinema also proved unsuccessful.

Vikram landed his breakthrough role of a college student who suffers a brain injury in filmmaker Bala's directorial debut, the tragedy film Sethu (1999). It was a sleeper hit and earned Vikram a Special Jury award at the Filmfare and Tamil Nadu State Film Award ceremonies. In 2001, he played an aspiring policeman in the action film Dhill, the directorial debut of Dharani. In 2002, Vikram was awarded his first Filmfare Award for Best Actor for portraying a blind village singer in the Vinayan-directed tragedy Kasi (2001), a remake of the director's Malayalam film Vasanthiyum Lakshmiyum Pinne Njaanum (1999). Vikram went on to play the quintessential Tamil action hero in a series of commercial successful masala films beginning with Gemini (2002) which grossed 210 million at the box office. Gemini film was the highest grossing Tamil film of the year 2002. The next year, with consecutive commercial success in Dhool (2003) and Saamy (2003), he attained stardom. He then played an undertaker with autism in Bala's tragedy drama Pithamagan (2003) co-starring Suriya. His portrayal attracted positive reviews and garnered him his third Filmfare award, and Best Actor trophies at the Tamil Nadu State Film Award and National Film Award ceremonies.

Vikram underwent a professional setback between 2004 and 2008 when a series of films—Arul (2004), Majaa (2005) and Bheemaa (2008)—received mixed reviews and were commercial failures. Vikram's sole box-office success during this period was S. Shankar's psychological thriller Anniyan (2005), in which he played a utopian lawyer suffering from multiple personality disorder. The film was the second highest grossing Tamil film of the year 2005 by collecting ₹57 crore from the box office. The film was commercial success in all the South Indian states- Tamil Nadu, Kerala (where the film was the highest grossing Tamil film in Kerala  at that time which ran over 150 days in theatres), Andhra Pradesh (where the dubbed version Aparichitudu was highest-grossing film of 2005) and Karnataka. The film also earned him critical acclaim and his fourth Filmfare award. Meanwhile, Vikram ventured into film production by joining a production company, Reel Life Entertainment, as one of its directors. In Susi Ganesan's Kanthaswamy (2009), he played a CBI officer who moonlights as a superhero. In 2010, Vikram was introduced in Bollywood by Mani Ratnam through his Hindi-Tamil bilingual Raavan and Raavanan, a contemporary retelling of the Ramayana, in which Vikram played the antagonist and protagonist in the respective versions. Vikram earned mixed reviews for his characterisation in the former; but his performance in the latter earned him rave reviews and his fifth Filmfare award. In 2011, Vikram played a man with developmental disability fighting over his daughter's custody in A. L. Vijay's courtroom drama Deiva Thirumagal, an adaptation of the American film I Am Sam (2001). Vikram's performance was praised and won him the Critics Award for Best Actor at Filmfare. However, his next role of an aspiring screen villain in Rajapattai (2011) was poorly received.

In 2012, Vikram appeared in A. L. Vijay's revenge-thriller Thaandavam, playing a blind RAW agent who uses human echolocation to track down his betrayer. In Bejoy Nambiar's three-story-arc Hindi-language anthology film David (2013), he played one of the three eponymous lead characters, an alcoholic fisherman in love with his friend's fiancée. Shankar's romantic-thriller I (2015) featured Vikram as a supermodel-turned-hunchback who exacts revenge on his conspirators. The film grossed over  2.4 billion at the box office and Vikram's performance was critically acclaimed. Then he acted in 10 Endrathukulla (2015), Iru Mugan (2016), Sketch (2018), Saamy Square (2018), Kadaram Kondan (2019) and Mahaan (2022)

Film

As an actor 
All films are in Tamil unless otherwise noted.

As a dubbing artist

Television

Commercial

Music video

See also
 List of awards and nominations received by Vikram

Explanatory notes

References

External links
 
 

Indian filmographies
Male actor filmographies
Discographies of Indian artists